North Carolina's 15th Senate district is one of 50 districts in the North Carolina Senate. It has been represented by Democrat Jay Chaudhuri since 2019.

Geography
Since 2003, the district has covered part of Wake County. The district overlaps with the 11th, 34th, 38th, and 49th state house districts.

District officeholders since 1999

Election results

2022

2020

2018

2016

2014

2012

2010

2008

2006

2004

2002

2000

References

North Carolina Senate districts
Wake County, North Carolina